Merrifieldia huberti is a moth of the family Pterophoridae that is endemic to Kyrgyzstan.

References

Moths described in 1999
huberti
Endemic fauna of Kyrgyzstan
Moths of Asia